The 1986 United States Senate election in Kentucky was held on November 4, 1986, concurrently with other elections to the United States Senate in other states as well as elections to the United States House of Representatives and various state and local elections. Incumbent Democrat Wendell Ford won re-election in a landslide against Republican Jackson Andrews, winning every county in the state.

Democratic primary
Wendell Ford was unchallenged.

Republican Primary

Candidates
Jackson Andrews, attorney
Carl Brown
Tommy Klein
Thurman Jerome Hamlin

Results

Results

See also
1986 United States Senate elections

References

1986
Kentucky
United States Senate